Camp Union near Sacramento, California was a military training center for the Union Army during the American Civil War. First constructed near Sacramento, across the river from Sutterville the camp operated from 1861 until it was evacuated due to the flood waters from the Great Flood of 1862.  The second camp site was located on the east side of the river in Sutterville.  These camps primarily served as a training camps for California volunteer regiments.  Toward the end of the conflict, the camp became a discharge center for returning troops until the post was closed and abandoned in 1866.

The troops of the 5th Regiment California Volunteer Infantry, organized and training in the camp at the time, aided the flooded capital of California during the Great Flood.

References
 Historic California Posts: Camp Union, California State Military Department, The California State Military Museum, militarymuseum.org accessed Oct. 19, 2013

California in the American Civil War
History of Sacramento, California
American Civil War army posts
1861 establishments in California